Ritter is an unincorporated community in Grant County, Oregon, United States, ten miles down the Middle Fork John Day River from U.S. Route 395, between Dale and Long Creek. At one time the locale was also known as Ritter Hot Springs.

When a post office was established in this locale, it was named for the Rev. Joseph Ritter, a pioneer Baptist minister of the John Day Valley, on whose ranch it was situated. The post office was originally near the mineral hot springs there, formerly known as McDuffee Hot Springs but now known as Ritter Hot Springs. In 1988, the post office had moved to the old schoolhouse across the river. As of 2009, Ritter no longer has its own post office; Ritter's mail is addressed to Long Creek.

The springs were discovered by William Neal McDuffee, an early-day packer who traveled between Umatilla and the John Day Valley mines.

References

External links
Ritter Hot Springs, current hot springs resort business in Ritter 
"The Ritter Hot Springs", reprint of November 23, 1972 Blue Mountain Eagle article by Jo Southworth

Unincorporated communities in Grant County, Oregon
Spa towns in Oregon
Unincorporated communities in Oregon